Mkhitar Gosh (1130–1213) or Mkhitar the Thinbearded was an Armenian scholar, writer, public figure, thinker, and priest. He was one of the representatives of the Armenian Renaissance.

Biography
He was born in the city of Gandzak . He got his early education from public institutions. When he reached his adolescence he decided to dedicate his life to the church. In order to learn theology more thoroughly, Gosh traveled to Cilicia, to the Black Mountains (Սև լեռներ) and studied orthodox theology under the local priests. Upon his return, he, along with the princes' Zakare and Ivane Zakarian financial help, built the Ghetik (Գետիկ) church.

He wrote a code of laws including civil and Canon law that was used in both Greater Armenia and Cilicia. It was also used in Poland, by order of king Sigismund the Old, as the law under which the Armenians of Lviv and Kamianets-Podilskyi lived from 1519 until the region fell under Austrian rule in 1772. He also wrote a number of popular fables. He founded the monastery of Nor-Getik which he was later buried. Ever since his death it has become better known as Goshavank. The works of Mkhitar Gosh were later adapted into a Datastanagirk''' codex in Middle Armenian, which was prepared by Sempad the Constable,  an  Armenian noble, military commander, and judge in the 13th century.

 See also 
 Vardan Aygektsi

Notes

External links

Robert W. Thomson. The Lawcode (Datastanagirk') of Mxit'ar Goš. — Rodopi, 2000
English translations of Gosh's Fables and his Colophon are available at: http://rbedrosian.com/hsrces.html
English translations of the Fables and Colophon - mirror if main site unavailable''
Grave of Mkhitar Gosh

1130 births
1213 deaths
Armenian priests
Armenian legal writers
Armenian fabulists
Medieval law